Glanrhyd railway station served the town of Llandeilo, Carmarthenshire, Wales, from 1858 to 1955 on the Vale of Towy Railway.

History 
The station was opened as Glanrhyd in May 1858 by the Vale of Towy Railway. It was known as Glan Rhyd in the handbook of stations. It closed on 20 July 1931 but reopened as Glanrhyd Halt on 19 December 1938. It closed permanently on 7 March 1955.

References 

Disused railway stations in Carmarthenshire
Railway stations in Great Britain opened in 1858
Railway stations in Great Britain closed in 1931
Railway stations in Great Britain opened in 1938
Railway stations in Great Britain closed in 1955
1858 establishments in Wales
1955 disestablishments in Wales